The Wola massacre was the systematic killing of between 40,000 and 50,000 Poles in the Wola neighbourhood of the Polish capital city, Warsaw, by the German Wehrmacht and fellow Axis collaborators in the Azerbaijani Legion, as well as the mostly-Russian RONA forces, which took place from 5 to 12 August 1944. The massacre was ordered by Adolf Hitler, who directed to kill "anything that moves" to stop the Warsaw Uprising soon after it began.

Tens of thousands of Polish civilians along with captured Home Army resistance fighters were brutally murdered by the Germans in organised mass executions throughout Wola. Whole families, including babies, children and the elderly, were often shot on the spot, but some were killed after torture and sexual assault. Soldiers murdered patients in hospitals, killing them in their beds, as well as the doctors and nurses caring for them. Dead bodies were piled up to be burned by the Verbrennungskommando ("burning detachment") to destroy the evidence of the massacre; though first, dogs were let loose to find survivors to be killed. The operation was led by Erich von dem Bach-Zelewski, though its main perpetrators were the Dirlewanger Brigade and the "RONA" Kaminski Brigade, whose forces committed the cruelest atrocities, drawing criticism from Bach-Zelewski himself.

The Germans anticipated that these atrocities would crush the insurrectionists' will to fight and put the uprising to a swift end. However, the ruthless pacification of Wola only stiffened Polish resistance, and it took another two months of heavy fighting for the Germans to regain control of the city.

Massacre

The Warsaw Uprising broke out on 1 August 1944. During the first few days the Polish resistance managed to liberate most of Warsaw on the left bank of the river Vistula (an uprising also broke out in the district of Praga on the right bank of the river but was quickly suppressed by the Germans). Two days after the start of the fighting, SS General Erich von dem Bach-Zelewski was placed in command of all German forces in Warsaw. Following direct orders from SS-Reichsfűhrer Heinrich Himmler to suppress the uprising without mercy, his strategy was to include the use of terror tactics against the inhabitants of Warsaw. No distinction would be made between insurrectionists and civilians as Himmler's orders explicitly stated that Warsaw was to be completely destroyed and that the civilian population was to be exterminated.

Professor Timothy Snyder, of Yale University, wrote that "the massacres in Wola had nothing in common with combat ... the ratio of civilian to military dead was more than a thousand to one, even if military casualties on both sides are counted."

On 5 August, three German battle groups started their advance toward the city centre from the western outskirts of the Wola district, along Wolska and Górczewska streets. The German forces consisted of units from the Wehrmacht and the SS Police Battalions, as well as the mostly Russian SS-Sturmbrigade RONA and the SS-Sturmbrigade Dirlewanger, an infamous Waffen SS penal unit led by SS-Oberführer Oskar Dirlewanger, which included the Azerbaijani Legion (part of the Ostlegionen). British historian Martin Windrow described Dirlewanger's unit as a "terrifying rabble" of "cut-throats, [foreign] renegades, sadistic morons, and cashiered rejects from other units".

Shortly after their advance toward the centre of Warsaw began, the two lead battle groups — Kampfgruppe "Rohr" (led by Generalmajor Günter Rohr) and Kampfgruppe "Reinefarth" (led by Heinz Reinefarth) — were halted by heavy fire from Polish resistance fighters. Unable to proceed forward, some of the German troops began to go from house to house carrying out their orders to shoot all inhabitants. Many civilians were shot on the spot but some were killed after torture and sexual assault. Estimates vary, but Reinefarth himself has estimated that up to 10,000 civilians were killed in the Wola district on 5 August alone, the first day of the operation. Most of the victims were the elderly, women and children.

The majority of these atrocities were committed by troops under the command of Oskar Dirlewanger and SS-Brigadeführer Bronislav Kaminski. Research historian Martin Gilbert, from the University of Oxford, wrote: 

"More than fifteen thousand Polish civilians had been murdered by German troops in Warsaw. At 5:30 that evening [August 5], General Erich von dem Bach gave the order for the execution of women and children to stop. But the killing continued of all Polish men who were captured, without anyone bothering to find out whether they were insurrectionists or not. Nor did either the Cossacks or the criminals in the Kaminsky and Dirlewanger brigades pay any attention to von dem Bach Zelewski's order: by rape, murder, torture and fire, they made their way through the suburbs of Wola and Ochota, killing in three days of slaughter a further thirty thousand civilians, including hundreds of patients in each of the hospitals in their path."

Two hours before midnight on 5 August the Azerbaijani soldiers and Bergmann Battalion attacked St Lazarus hospital, executed hundreds of patients, doctors, and nurses, before burning it down.

On 5 August, the Zośka battalion of the Home Army had managed to liberate the Gęsiówka concentration camp and to take control of the strategically important surrounding area of the former Warsaw Ghetto with the aid of two captured Panther tanks belonging to a unit commanded by Wacław Micuta. Over the next few days of fighting this area became one of the main communication links between Wola and Warsaw's Old Town district, allowing insurrectionists and civilians to gradually withdraw from Wola ahead of the superior German forces that had been deployed against them.

On 7 August, the German ground forces were strengthened further. To enhance their effectiveness, the Germans began to use civilians as human shields when approaching positions held by the Polish resistance. These tactics combined with their superior numbers and firepower helped them to fight their way to Bankowy Square in the northern part of Warsaw's city centre and cut the Wola district in half.

German units burned down two local hospitals with some of the patients still inside. Hundreds of other patients and personnel were killed by indiscriminate gunfire and grenade attacks or selected and led away for executions. The greatest number of killings took place at the railway embankment on Górczewska Street and two large factories on Wolska Street – the Ursus Factory at Wolska 55 and the Franaszka Factory at Wolska 41/45 – as well as the Pfeiffer Factory at 57/59 Okopowa Street. At each of these four locations, thousands of people were systematically executed in mass shootings, having been previously rounded up in other places and taken there in groups.

Between 8 and 23 August the SS formed groups of men from the Wola district into the so-called Verbrennungskommando ("burning detachment"), who were forced to hide evidence of the massacre by burning the victims' bodies and homes. Most of the men put to work in such groups were later executed.

On 12 August, the order was given to stop the indiscriminate killing of Polish civilians in Wola. Erich von dem Bach issued a new directive stating that captured civilians were to be evacuated from the city and deported to concentration camps or to Arbeitslager labour camps.

Aftermath

No one belonging to the German forces who took part in the atrocities committed during the Warsaw Uprising was ever prosecuted for them after the end of the Second World War. The main perpetrators of the Wola massacre and similar massacres in the nearby Ochota district were Heinz Reinefarth and Oskar Dirlewanger. Dirlewanger, who presided over and personally participated in many of the worst acts of violence, was arrested on 1 June 1945 by French occupation troops while hiding under a false name near the town of Altshausen in Upper Swabia. He died on 7 June 1945 in a French prison camp at Altshausen, probably as a result of ill-treatment by his Polish guards. In 1945, Reinefarth was taken into custody by the Allied authorities but was never prosecuted for his actions in Warsaw, despite Polish requests for his extradition. After a West German court released him citing a lack of evidence, Reinefarth enjoyed a successful post-war career as a lawyer, becoming the mayor of Westerland, and a member of the Landtag parliament of Schleswig-Holstein. The West German government also gave the former SS-Obergruppenführer a general's pension before he died in 1979.

In May 2008, a list of several former SS Dirlewanger members who were still alive was compiled and published by the Warsaw Uprising Museum.

See also
 Suppression of Mokotów
 Ochota massacre
 Wawer massacre
 Military history of the Warsaw Uprising
 Nazi crimes against ethnic Poles
 Tchorek plaques
Nanjing Massacre

Notes

References

External links

Witness testimony on German massacre of Polish hospital patients
Witness testimony on German massacre of Polish civilians in Wola
 Nacht über Wola, Der Spiegel 1962
Genocide in Wola - a district sentenced to death - collection of civilian testimonies from "Chronicles of Terror"
Unraveling a 70-Year-Old Photographic Mystery - Tereska, the girl from famous David Seymour's photography, revealed to be a survivor of the Wola Massacre
The forgotten genocide - Wola massacre by Piotr Gursztyn

Mass murder in 1944
Nazi war crimes during the Warsaw Uprising
Ordnungspolizei
Wola
Wartime sexual violence in World War II
Massacres in 1944